James Robert Martin (born 20 April 1981) is an Australian politician who currently serves as the Labor member for Stretton in the Queensland Legislative Assembly, having been elected at the 2021 Stretton state by-election on 24 July 2021.

Martin replaced Duncan Pegg, who died of cancer in June 2021. Prior to his election, Martin had worked as an electorate officer for Pegg from 2015 until Pegg's death. He had previously contested Calamvale Ward at the local government elections for Brisbane City Council in 2020, achieving an 11.4% primary swing towards Labor but was not elected. He holds a Bachelor's degree from Griffith University and a Master's degree from University of Queensland.

References

1981 births
Living people
Australian Labor Party members of the Parliament of Queensland
Labor Right politicians
Members of the Queensland Legislative Assembly
University of Queensland alumni